The 2018–19 Army Black Knights men's basketball team represents the United States Military Academy during the 2018–19 NCAA Division I women's basketball season. The Black Knights, led by thirteenth year head coach Dave Magarity, play their home games at Christl Arena and were members of the Patriot League. They finished the season 11–19, 6–12 in Patriot League play to finish in seventh place. They lost in the quarterfinals of the Patriot League women's tournament to Lafayette.

Roster

Schedule

|-
!colspan=9 style=| Exhibition

|-
!colspan=9 style=| Non-conference regular season

|-
!colspan=9 style=| Patriot League regular season

|-
!colspan=9 style=| Patriot League Women's Tournament

Rankings
2018–19 NCAA Division I women's basketball rankings

See also
2018–19 Army Black Knights men's basketball team

References

Army
Army Black Knights women's basketball seasons
Army
Army